is a common Japanese given name, used for women.

Possible writings
Yuriko can be written using different kanji characters and can mean:
百合子, "lily, child"
由里子, "reason, hometown, child"
由利子, "reason, benefit, child"
由李子, "reason, plum, child"
優梨子, "tenderness, pear, child"
有里子, "possess, hometown, child"
The name can also be written in hiragana or katakana.

Real people
with the given name Yuriko
Alisa Yuriko Durbrow (ユリコ), a Japanese model, actress, and singer
Yuriko Chiba (千羽 由利子), a Japanese animation director
Yuriko Doi, choreographer and stage director
Yuriko Fuchizaki (渕崎 ゆり子), a Japanese voice actress
Yuriko Handa (百合子), a Japanese volleyball player
, Japanese high jumper
Yuriko Hishimi (ひし美 ゆり子), a Japanese actress
Yuriko Ishida (石田 ゆり子), a Japanese actress
Yuriko Kaida (貝田 由里子), a Japanese singer
Yuriko Kajiya (百合子), a Japanese ballerina
Yuriko Kikuchi (née Amemiya, 1920–2022), a Japanese American dancer
Yuriko Kobayashi (祐梨子), a Japanese middle distance runner
Yuriko Koike (小池 百合子), a Japanese politician
Yuriko Kuronuma (ユリ子), a Japanese violinist
Yuriko Miyamoto (宮本 百合子), a Japanese novelist
Yuriko Nakamura (由利子), a Japanese composer and pianist
, Japanese footballer
Yuriko Shiratori (百合子), a Japanese gravure idol, tarento and actress
Yuriko Takagi (高木 百合子), later Princess Mikasa of Japan
, Japanese weightlifter
, Japanese slalom canoeist
Yuriko Yamaguchi (山口 由里子), (born 1965) a Japanese voice actress
Yuriko Yamaguchi, a Japanese American sculptor
Yuriko Yamamoto (山本 百合子), a Japanese voice actress
Yuriko Yoshitaka (吉高 由里子), a Japanese actress

Fictional characters
with the given name Yuriko
Yuriko Omega, the commando unit of the Empire of the Rising Sun in the real-time strategy video game Command & Conquer: Red Alert 3
Yuriko Oyama (ユリコ・オヤマ, also known as Lady Deathstrike), a Marvel Comics villain
Yuriko Star (ユリコ), a character in the manga and anime series The Irresponsible Captain Tylor
Yuriko Janetson is the name of the narrator's daughter in Joanna Russ's short story "When It Changed"
Yuriko Suzuhina is the name of the cross dressing version of Accelerator by Kamijou Touma in the To Aru Majutsu no Index.
Yuriko Edogawa, a character from Ultra Q
Yuriko, the Tiger's Shadow is a card from the Magic: The Gathering trading card game.
Yuriko Nishinotouin, Head of the Traditional Culture Research Club at Hyakkou Private Academy in the anime Kakegurui.

See also
Yuri (Japanese name)
13146 Yuriko, a Main-belt Asteroid

References

Japanese feminine given names